Variola is a Latin name for smallpox.

Variola may also refer to:
 Variola (fish), a genus of fish

See also
 Variola caprina, the virus that causes goatpox
 Variola porcina, the virus that causes swinepox
 Variola vera, another Latin name for smallpox
 Variola Vera, a 1982 Serbian film about the 1972 Yugoslav smallpox outbreak